Boris Spiegel (born 18 February 1953 in Khmelnytskyi, Ukraine) is a Russian politician and businessman. Haaretz describes him as an oligarch who is "closely tied to the Kremlin." From 2003 to 2013, he represented Penza Oblast in the Russian Federation Council; in December 2011, he was appointed the First Deputy Chairman of the Committee on Constitutional Legislation, Legal and Judicial Affairs and Civil Society Development.

In 2010, he founded World Without Nazism, an organisation with close ties to the Russian government, formed to affirm the Russian version of history, particularly in relation to the Soviet occupation of the Baltic states and the Holodomor. This followed the establishment of the Presidential Commission of the Russian Federation to Counter Attempts to Falsify History to the Detriment of Russia's Interests the previous year. The organization is described in the Annual Review of the Estonian Security Police as a propaganda organization aimed at promoting "a Soviet-era  approach to World War II." It cooperates closely with the Finnish Anti-Fascist Committee. He is also chairman of the organization World Congress of Russian Jewry (WCRJ), an organisation that according to The Jewish Chronicle "works on behalf of the Kremlin" despite its nominal independence. During the 2008 South Ossetia War, acting as president of WCRJ, he accused Georgia of committing genocide, which attracted criticism from Israeli voices.

The Jewish Chronicle writes that Spiegel "is firmly in the pro-Putin camp. His subservience was clearly on show […] during the fighting in the Caucasus when he joined the Kremlin's propaganda campaign calling for the establishment of a tribunal that would investigate Georgia's 'war crimes' and 'genocide.'"

Spiegel has accused the countries that were formerly part of the Communist Bloc (except Russia and Belarus) of "rapid nazification". He also criticizes the "Western European democracies" for their alleged role in starting World War II. He proposes a common history textbook for all of Europe based on "serious scientific study, as well as the decisions of international judicial and political authorities on which basis the postwar world order had been built."

He founded the pharmaceutical company  in 1990 and the music production company "Music. Perfection. Beauty" in 1999. He has been deputy chairman of the political party Revival of Russia since 2002.

In January 2011, Spiegel was the subject of media attention when he was robbed of $280,000 in cash in his hotel room.

He is the former father-in-law of popular Russian tenor singer Nikolay Baskov.

He is one of the few Russian politicians who openly proclaim himself as an adherent of Judaism. On Spiegel's initiative, monuments depicting Soviet Red Army soldiers have been erected in the Israeli city of Netanya.

In March 2013, Spiegel resigned from the Russian Federation Council.

During COVID-19 pandemic Spiegel's companies were one of the major Russian suppliers of antiviral medications (Avifavir, Areplivir), diagnostic systems Biozek and antiseptic solutions. In 2020 his companies sold 45 billion Russian ruble (approximately $600 million) worth of Covid medications.

Spiegel and his wife Evgenia Spiegel were detained by the Russian police in March 2021 in connection with allegedly giving bribes to Penza Oblast governor Ivan Belozertsev. In his March 2021 with Marina Litvinovich Spiegel alleged that his criminal case was fabricated in order to change the ownership of his successful pharmaceutical business, complained about the tortuous detention conditions and compared himself with Sergei Magnitsky.

References

External links

Jewish Russian politicians
Russian businesspeople
Members of the Federation Council of Russia (after 2000)
1953 births
Living people
Russian oligarchs
Politicians from Khmelnytskyi, Ukraine
Businesspeople in the pharmaceutical industry